Ken Flach and Robert Seguso were the defending champions but lost in the first round to Peter Doohan and Paul McNamee.

Andrés Gómez and Ivan Lendl won in the final 7–5, 6–4 against Doohan and McNamee.

Seeds

  Ken Flach /  Robert Seguso (first round)
  Scott Davis /  David Pate (first round)
  Peter Fleming /  Christo van Rensburg (first round)
  Brad Gilbert /  Vince Van Patten (semifinals)

Draw

External links
 1986 Paine Webber Classic Doubles Draw

Doubles